Marwan Youssef ( born 19 April 1994) is a Lebanese singer and songwriter. He rose to fame when he won the 11th season of Star Academy in 2015–16. After his victory, Marwan released two singles and one music video, and performed many concerts in music festivals in the Arab World.

Early life 
Marwan Youssef''' was born in to a family of Lebanese Christians. Marwan performed on TV before Star Academy on religious Christian TV channel NourSat.

 Career 

Star Academy Arabia 11 and Watan Hobbi: 2015–2016 
Marwan Youssef entered season 11 of Star Academy as one of 18 contestants. Throughout his 4 months on the show, he was chosen twice as top student and never fell into the danger zone. Youssef won the final prime with 55.46% of the votes, beating the 3 other finalists. As one of his prizes, Marwan won a song produced by Endemol Shine Middle East, titled Watan Hobbi''.

Rafed Saddek- present: 2016-present 
Marwan released a second single "Rafed Saddek" and a music video under Watary Productions. The song performed well on Anghami. Marwan Youssef performed at many important festivals, such as Ehmej Festival.

Discography

Singles 

 2016: Watan Hobbi
 2017: Rafed Saddek

Music Videos
 2017: Rafed Saddek

Live recordings
Marwan Youssef performed many songs live through his time on Star Academy, that can be found on Star Academy's YouTube Channel

Recognition
 2016: Murex d'Or Nomination for Best Lebanese New Talent Singer

References

1994 births
Living people
21st-century Lebanese male singers